The Albert Gnaegi Center for Health Care Ethics is an independent health sciences academic unit of Saint Louis University. The center has a high academic output and offers Doctorate of Philosophy programmes in Health Care Ethics and clinical bioethics. The current director, Jeffrey Bishop, joined the Center in July 2010 from Vanderbilt University and was previously at the Peninsula College of Medicine and Dentistry in the United Kingdom and the University of Texas. He is the author of The Anticipitory Corpse: Medicine, Power, and the Care of the Dying and sits on the editorial board of The Journal of Medicine and Philosophy and The Journal of Christian Bioethics, both Oxford Journals. Other notable staff include Griffen Trotter, M.D., PhD, and Tobias Winright, PhD, who holds the Hubert Maeder Endowed Chair in Health Care Ethics and is Associate Professor of Theological Ethics in the Department of Theological Studies at Saint Louis University.

References

External links 
 

Bioethics
Bioethics research organizations
Medical ethics
Saint Louis University